Turček is a village and municipality in Turčianske Teplice District in the Žilina Region of northern central Slovakia.

History
In historical records, the village was first mentioned in 1371. The village belonged to a German language island. The German population was expelled in 1945.

Geography
The municipality lies at an altitude of 660 metres and covers an area of 53.011 km². It has a population of about 694 people.

External links
http://www.statistics.sk/mosmis/eng/run.html
http://www.obecturcek.sk/

Villages and municipalities in Turčianske Teplice District